Old Dick was launched at Bermuda in 1789. She sailed to England and was lengthened in 1792. From 1792 on she made two full voyages as a Liverpool-based slave ship. On her second she recaptured two British merchant ships. She was lost in 1796 at Jamaica after having landed her third cargo of slaves.

Career
Old Dick first appeared in Lloyd's Register (LR) in 1792 with Threlfall, master, J.Gregson, owner, and trade Liverpool–Africa.

1st slave voyage (1792–1793): Captain Joseph Threlfall sailed from Liverpool on 17 July 1792, bound for West Africa. She started gathering slaves in Africa on 16 September and departed for Grenada on 11 January 1793. She arrived at Grenada on 26 February. She had embarked 349 slaves and she delivered 344. She sailed from Grenada on 17 March and arrived back at Liverpool on 2 May. She had left Liverpool with 28 crew members and suffered three crew deaths on the voyage. 

2nd slave voyage (1794–1795): With the onset of war with France, Captain James Bird acquired a letter of marque on 14 May 1794. Old Dick sailed from Liverpool on 27 May.

On 28 May 1794 two French frigates captured Martin, Brownrigg, master, sailing from Whitehaven to Antigua. Old Dick recaptured Martin and brought her into Liverpool. Old Dick also recaptured Ilfracombe, which had been sailing from Oporto to Dublin when she was taken. Ilfracombe then arrived in Liverpool too.

Captain James Bird sailed from Liverpool on 27 May 1794. Old Dick arrived in Africa and started to gather her slaves at Loango on 3 August. She sailed from Africa on 21 October and arrived at Grenada on 19 December. She had embarked 350 slaves and she landed 344. She sailed from Grenada on 21 December and arrived back at Liverpool on 26 February 1795. She had left Liverpool with 27 crew members and suffered four crew deaths on the voyage. 

3rd slave voyage (1795–1796): Captain Bird sailed from Liverpool on 26 September 1795. Old Dick acquired her slaves at Bonny, or possibly Annamaboe She delivered 340 to Kingston on 2 April 1796. Four of her crew of 31 died on her voyage.

Fate
Old Dick was lost on Rocky Point, near Morant Bay, Jamaica, probably in May. Her crew and some materials were saved.

Notes, citations, and references
Notes

Citations

References
 

1789 ships
Ships built in Bermuda
Age of Sail ships of England
Liverpool slave ships
Maritime incidents in 1796
Maritime incidents involving slave ships
Shipwrecks in the Caribbean Sea